Jechapita (possibly from Quechua Hich'apita) is a volcano in the Andes of Peru, about  high. It is situated in the "Valley of the Volcanoes" in the Arequipa Region, Castilla Province, Andagua District. Jechapita lies west of the Chachas Lake and north-west of the volcano Chilcayoc Grande and south of the volcano Chilcayoc.

References

Volcanoes of Peru
Mountains of Arequipa Region
Mountains of Peru
Landforms of Arequipa Region